The Arms Corporation of the Philippines (Armscor) is a firearms manufacturing company headquartered in the Philippines. The company is known for its inexpensive 1911-pattern pistols, revolvers, shotguns, sporting rifles, firearms parts and ammunition. The company, whose manufacturing facility is located in Marikina, produces about 200,000 firearms and some 420 million rounds of ammunition a year, where 80 percent of this is exported and sold to over 60 countries. In 2017, the company was renamed Armscor Global Defense, Inc..

History

Armscor traces its roots back to a Manila print shop, Squires Bingham & Co., founded in 1905. The print shop later imported and sold motorcycles and various sporting goods, which included some firearms and ammunition. The company was bought by the Tuason family in 1941 and began making firearms through the present corporation in 1952. Armscor manufactures its own line of firearms and holds manufacturing contracts for other companies' firearm lines, such as Twin Pines' Rock Island Armory (RIA) pistols. In addition to the Rock Island Armory 1911 series pistols, Armscor is the source of pistols for STI's Spartan, Cimarron Firearms pre-1923 Model 1911, and Charles Daly 1911 style pistols. Armscor is an ISO 9001 certified compliant company which manufactures weapons using CNC (Computer Numerical Control) equipment.

The company is headquartered in Marikina, Philippines and represented in the United States by its subsidiary Armscor International, Inc, located in Pahrump, Nevada with facilities in Stevensville, Montana.

Armscor became a registered trademark on February 24, 2009.

Ownership/Management
Armscor is owned by the Squires Bingham Co. Inc, a holding company for the family of Don Celso Tuason.  Don Celso's eldest son Demetrio "Bolo" Tuason is the Chairman Emeritus.  Younger brother Daniel "Concoy" oversees production and plant operation.  Bolo's son, Martin, is currently the president and CEO of the company.

Products
While it is primarily known as a manufacturer of M1911 pistols, Armscor manufactures and markets a number of other handgun, revolver, shotgun and rifle models as well as ammunition and accessories.

Revolvers
 M200
 M202
 M206

Handguns
Armscor's handguns are based on the Colt M1911A1 design and Tanfoglio versions of the CZ-75.

 GI Series
 1911 Tactical Series
 Match Series
 2011 Tactical Series
 22 TCM/Micro Mag Series
 XT 22 Series
 MAP/MAPP Series - Armscor assembled and marketed Tanfoglio Combat and Force pistols.

Shotguns
Based on design of High Standard Flite King shotgun.
 M30

Rifles
The company has been making bolt-action and rimfire rifles since 1980.
 MAK 22 Also known as AK 22
 M1600
 M1400TS
 M1400E
 M1500TM
 M1700
 MIG 22 Standard
 MIG 22 Target
 TCM 22 Rifle

Innovations
Armscor introduced a new propriety caliber named the .22 TCM (Tuason Craig Micromag) based on the 1911 pistol. The cartridge is essentially a 5.56×45mm NATO cartridge shortened to 1.265 in. total length with a 40-grain jacketed hollow point bullet. Its main characteristics are its high velocity and low recoil, allowing for repeated accurate shots.

More recently the company has released a bolt-action rifle chambered for this cartridge.

AFP (Armscor) Arsenal Battalion

Due to the nature of the Business of ARMSCOR, it has been tapped by the Armed Forces of the Philippines to be one of its partners as an "Affiliate Reserve Unit". The company was designated as the 1st (ARMSCOR) Arsenal Battalion (Reserve) and placed under the operational control of the Armed Forces of the Philippines Reserve Command.

See also
 PROGUN
 Rock Island Armory 1911 series
 Armscor (South Africa)

References

External links

 Official Page of ARMSCOR Philippines (Archived)
 Official Page of ARMSCOR USA
 Squires Bingham Mod. 20 carbine explained (ebook)

Firearm manufacturers of the Philippines
Companies based in Marikina
1905 establishments in the Philippines